Ctenophora festiva is a true crane fly species in the genus Ctenophora. It is found in Europe.

References 

Tipulidae
Insects described in 1804
Nematoceran flies of Europe
Taxa named by Johann Wilhelm Meigen